The following outline is provided as an overview of and topical guide to education in China:

Education by location
Education in China
Exams
Gaokao
Senior High School Entrance Examination
Education in Hong Kong
Exams and exam authority
Hong Kong Examinations and Assessment Authority
Heung Shing
Hong Kong Advanced Level Examination
Hong Kong Certificate of Education Examination
Hong Kong Diploma of Secondary Education
Hong Kong Higher Level Examination
Secondary School Entrance Examination
Cram schools in Hong Kong
Education in Macau
Education in Taiwan
Exams
Basic Competence Test for Junior High School Students
Comprehensive Assessment Program for Junior High School Students
General Scholastic Ability Test
Scholarships in Taiwan
Huayu Enrichment Scholarship
Taiwan Scholarship
Engineering education in Taiwan
Secondary education in Taiwan
List of Chinese language schools in Taiwan for foreign students
Chinese school

Historical perspectives
History of education in China
Imperial examination
Zhuangyuan

Educational institutions
Academies of Classical Learning
Culai Academy
White Deer Grotto Academy
Yuelu Academy
Taixue
Academies
Guozijian
Donglin Academy
Dongpo Academy
Hanlin Academy
Shang Xiang
Famous four universities in republican China
National Central University
National Southwestern Associated University
Wuhan University
Zhejiang University

China
Education in China